Ekaterina Samsonov (born January 1, 2003) is an American model and actress.

Early life 
Samsonov was born in New York City, the daughter of Ukrainian mother Galina and Russian father Alexander.

She holds both American and Russian citizenship.

Career 
As a model, Samsonov has worked with DKNY, H&M, Gap, J.Crew, Macy's, J. C. Penney, and Hewlett-Packard. As an actress, she is known for her role as Nina in the 2017 film You Were Never Really Here.

Filmography

Films

Television

References

External links 
 

2003 births
Living people
American female models
American child models
American child actresses
Models from New York City
American people of Russian descent
American people of Ukrainian descent
21st-century American women